Giancarlo Cella (born 5 September 1940 in Bobbio) is an Italian former footballer who played as a defender. He made more than 300 appearances in the Italian professional leagues, which included 172 appearances in Serie A, and then became a coach. He represented Italy at the 1960 Summer Olympics.

Cella's older brother Albino Cella also played football professionally. To distinguish them, Albino was known as Cella I and Giancarlo as Cella II.

Honours

Club
Inter
 Serie A champion: 1970–71

References

1940 births
Living people
Italian footballers
Italy under-21 international footballers
Olympic footballers of Italy
Association football defenders
Piacenza Calcio 1919 players
Torino F.C. players
Novara F.C. players
Catania S.S.D. players
Atalanta B.C. players
Inter Milan players
Serie A players
Serie B players
Footballers at the 1960 Summer Olympics
Italian football managers
Piacenza Calcio 1919 managers
S.P.A.L. managers
A.C. Carpi managers
Inter Milan non-playing staff